Electoral integrity refers to international standards and global norms governing the appropriate conduct of elections.

These standards have been endorsed in a series of authoritative conventions, treaties, protocols, and guidelines by agencies of the international community, notably by the decisions of the UN General Assembly, by regional bodies such as the Organization for Security and Cooperation in Europe (OSCE), the Organization of American States (OAS), and the African Union (AU), and by member states in the United Nations. Following endorsement, these standards apply universally to all countries throughout the electoral cycle, including during the pre-electoral period, the campaign, on polling day, and in its aftermath.

Electoral malpractice

The contrary notion of 'electoral malpractice' refers to contests violating international standards and global norms. Problems can arise at every stage of the process, from electoral and ballot access laws favoring incumbents to lack of a level playing field in money and media during campaigns to inaccurate voter registers, flawed counts and partial electoral management bodies.

There is nothing novel about problems of flawed or failed elections which suffer from fraud, corruption, or vote-rigging. Indeed, during the 18th and 19th Centuries, such practices were common in countries holding popular contests, including in rotten and pocket boroughs in Britain and machine politics in the United States. Concern about malpractices has grown in recent decades, however, along with the spread of elections to almost every state worldwide.

Contemporary campaigns attracting considerable international concern include allegations of irregularities occurring during the 2012 Russian presidential election and 2016 United Kingdom European Union membership referendum. Problems of violence during and after the 2007 Kenyan general election, and controversies in the 2013 Cambodian general election.

International principles

Standards for free and fair elections have been expressed in a number of international agreements.

Article 21(3) of the Universal Declaration of Human Rights (1948) states that "[t]he will of the people shall be the basis of the authority of government; this will shall be expressed in periodic and genuine elections which shall be by universal and equal suffrage and shall be held by secret vote or by equivalent free voting procedures."

These commitments were further developed in Article 25 of the UN International Covenant on Civil and Political Rights (ICCPR of 1966), namely the need for:

 periodic elections at regular intervals;
 universal suffrage that includes all sectors of society;
 equal suffrage, in the idea of one-person, one-vote;
 the right to stand for public office and contest elections;
 the rights of all eligible electors to vote;
 the use of a secret ballot process;
 genuine elections;
 elections that reflect the free expression of the will of the people.

The 1990 Copenhagen Document of the Conference on Security and Cooperation in Europe (CSCE) made commitments that included free elections at regular intervals; the popular election of all seats in at least one chamber; universal and equal suffrage; the right to establish political parties and their clear separation from the state; campaigning in a free and fair atmosphere; unimpeded access to media; secret ballots, with counting and reporting conducted honestly and the results reported publicly; and the due winners being installed and allowed to serve their full terms.

The 2002 Venice Commission’s Code of Good Practice in Electoral Matters spells out in detail what is meant by principles such as the universal, equal, free, secret, and direct suffrage.

Some of the most detailed standards are contained in the practical guidelines for electoral observers published by regional intergovernmental organizations, exemplified by the Election Observation Handbook of the Organization for Security and Co-operation in Europe. Similar principles have been adopted in the guidelines developed by the African Union, European Union, and Organization of American States.

The most recent statement of these norms is UN General Assembly resolution 63/163 (April 12, 2012): “Strengthening the role of the United Nations in enhancing periodic and genuine elections and the promotion of democratization.” The language in this document reflects and extends a series of similar statements of principle endorsed regularly by the United Nations since 1991. Resolution 63/163 reaffirms that “democracy is a universal value based on the freely expressed will of the people to determine their own political, economic, social and cultural systems and their full participation in all aspects of their lives.” Thus, democratic principles are explicitly endorsed by the United Nations General Assembly, along with a commitment to “the importance of fair, periodic and genuine elections” as the primary mechanism that allows citizens “to express their will.”

This does not imply, however, that the United Nations or the international community endorse any specific institutional design or constitutional mechanisms that can best achieve global norms, leaving this as a matter for national sovereignty. The UN resolution recognizes the responsibility of member states, “for ensuring free and fair elections, free of intimidation, coercion and tampering of vote counts, and that all such acts are sanctioned accordingly.” The United Nations’ role (especially through the Electoral Assistance Division of the Department of Political Affairs and the United Nations Development Programme) is seen as one of providing electoral assistance and support for the promotion of democratization, but only at the specific request of the member state.

Electoral integrity

According to the ACE Electoral Knowledge Network, "There is an ongoing debate over a single, universal definition of electoral integrity, but it can generally be defined as 'any election that is based on the democratic principles of universal suffrage and political equality as reflected in international standards and agreements, and is professional, impartial, and transparent in its preparation and administration throughout the electoral cycle.'"

In 2021, the Office of the United Nations High Commissioner for Human Rights published a revised edition of Human Rights and Elections: A Handbook on the Legal, Technical and Human Rights Aspects of Elections, which provides extensive guidance on the conduct of elections.

The Electoral Integrity Project presents an annual survey of academic opinions entitled Perceptions of Electoral Integrity. The Harvard University professor Pippa Norris, Toby S. James and Holly Ann Garnett coordinate the project. Denmark, Finland, Norway, Iceland and Germany scored highest in the period 2012 to 2018.

In their 2016 survey, Arizona scored the worst in the U.S., with a 53, and Vermont the best, with a 75, on a scale of 100, the Arizona Republic reported.  Slate reported that a score of 58 is around the same as Cuba. The Wall Street Journal called out the absurdity of the survey results: with a score of 56, Cuba "jails political dissidents, hasn't transferred power since 1959, unless the 2008 presidential handoff to Raúl Castro from Fidel Castro counts."

The results of the EIP survey - essentially a summary of opinions (lacking objective measurements) by self-identified academic experts contacted by email - were heavily criticized by other political scientists for using invalid methodology, and were condemned by statistician Andrew Gelman as "an unstable combination of political ideology, academic self-promotion, credulous journalism, and plain old incompetence."

See also
Election Defense Alliance
Election Security
Electoral fraud
Elections
Free and fair election
ICCPR
Open-source voting systems
Political corruption
Political finance
Venice Commission
Voting rights
Universal Declaration of Human Rights

References

External links
IFES Election Guide
Electoral Integrity Project

Elections
Election law
Human rights
Democracy
Democratization